Forrest Stanley (August 21, 1889 – August 27, 1969) was an American actor and screenplay writer best known for his work in silent film. He is particularly known for his role as Charles Brandon in the historical film When Knighthood Was in Flower (1922) by Robert G. Vignola and Charles Wilder in the murder mystery film The Cat and the Canary (1927) directed by Paul Leni.

Partial filmography

References

External links

 
 

1889 births
1969 deaths
American male film actors
20th-century American male actors